The Military Secretary to the Prime Minister (HaMazkir HaTzva'i Shel Rosh HaMemshala), is the senior military adviser to the Prime Minister of Israel on military and national security issues. As a member of the Military Staff, the position is privy to most products of the Israeli Intelligence Community. The position's current incumbent is Major General Avi Gil.

History
Earlier Military Secretaries held the rank of Lieutenant Colonel. In later years, Major-General's and Brigadier Generals have served in the position.

Position's influence
It has been suggested that the raising of status of the Military Secretary has resulted in military considerations unduly weighing upon Israel's national security policy at the expense of other considerations. It has been additionally suggested  that to remedy this, the position of Military Secretary ought to be held by a lower rank. Critics of this view have suggested that the Military Secretary's influence follows that of other positions, namely, the National Security Council and the National Security Advisor.

List of Military Secretaries

See also
 Director of National Intelligence, the equivalent in the United States

References

Israel Defense Forces
Government of Israel
Politics of Israel
Israeli Security Forces